Marc Rosset was the defending champion but lost in the second round to Julien Boutter.

Yevgeny Kafelnikov won in the final 7–6(7–5), 6–2 against Sébastien Grosjean.

Seeds

  Magnus Norman (second round)
  Yevgeny Kafelnikov (champion)
  Arnaud Clément (second round)
  Sébastien Grosjean (final)
  Cédric Pioline (quarterfinals)
  Roger Federer (semifinals)
  Marc Rosset (second round)
  Thomas Johansson (first round)

Draw

Finals

Top half

Bottom half

External links
 2001 Open 13 Singles draw

Open 13
2001 ATP Tour